is a junction passenger railway station located in Hodogaya-ku, Yokohama, Kanagawa Prefecture, Japan, operated by the private railway operator Sagami Railway (Sotetsu).

Lines
It is also a station on the Sōtetsu Shin-Yokohama Line.

Station layout
The station consists of two island platforms serving four tracks, connected to the station building by a footbridge.

Platforms

Adjacent stations

History 
Nishiya Station opened on 1 December 1926.

Developments

Through service between the Tōkyū Tōyoko Line, the Tōkyū Meguro Line and the Sōtetsu Main Line began on 18 March 2023. All Limited Express and Rapid trains stop at Nishiya as a result.

Passenger statistics
In fiscal 2019, the station was used by an average of 24,550 passengers daily.

The passenger figures for previous years are as shown below.

Surrounding area
 Japan National Route 16
 Senmarudai housing complex
 Sasayama housing complex

See also
 List of railway stations in Japan

References

External links 

  

Railway stations in Japan opened in 1926
Railway stations in Yokohama
Railway stations in Kanagawa Prefecture